Friedrich Knebel (died 1574) was an alderman of the Free City of Lübeck and a naval admiral who participated in the Northern Seven Years War as an ally of Denmark-Norway against Sweden. He commanded the Lübeck fleet at the first battle of Öland in 1564 and the naval battle of August 14, 1564 in the Baltic Sea.

References

16th-century births
1574 deaths
16th-century German businesspeople
Military personnel from Lübeck
People of the Northern Seven Years' War